Wimper Orlando Guerrero Reasco (7 February 1982 – 3 August 2014) was an Ecuadorian football midfielder.

Club career
Born in Babahoyo, Ecuador, Guerrero played for eight clubs, the final being Club Deportivo Venice.

Death
Guerrero died in Babahoyo in August 2014 after suffering a heart attack.

References

1982 births
2014 deaths
People from Babahoyo
Ecuadorian footballers
C.S. Emelec footballers
L.D.U. Loja footballers
C.S.D. Macará footballers
C.D. Técnico Universitario footballers

Association football midfielders